Russia–Sri Lanka relations are the bilateral relations between Russia and Sri Lanka.

Background

Soviet-era relations
The Soviet Union established diplomatic relations with Sri Lanka on December 3–6, 1956. In 1958, the USSR and Sri Lanka signed an agreement on economic and technical cooperation. In 1967, they built a steel mill (production capacity - 50,000 tons of stock per year), a tire plant, and a construction materials plant near Colombo all with the assistance of the Soviet Union.

Russian Federation relations

Political ties

In the UN, Russia has supported Sri Lanka in nearly every resolution brought forward against them. The most notable one was during the final stages of Sri Lanka's civil war in 2009 when European nations along with Canada and Mexico brought a ceasefire bill against the Sri Lanka Army. However, China and Russia vetoed that bill. Later on, another war crime bill that was tabled by Western nations against the Government of Sri Lanka was once again vetoed by Russia and China, along with several other nations.

Sri Lanka reacted in favor of Russia during the Ukrainian crisis, and said that the concerns of Russia were justifiable.

In 2022, Sri Lanka abstained from both Resolution ES-11/1 and Resolution ES-11/4 UN votes on Russia.

Military ties

Russia helped Sri Lanka to obtain Russian based weapons from several countries throughout the past 30 years. Examples of this would be Mikoyan-Gurevich MiG-27, Mil Mi-17 used by Sri Lanka Air Force and T-54/55 battle tanks, BTR-80 APC used by Sri Lanka Army.

In 2017, Sri Lanka ordered Gepard-class frigate worth US$158.5 million for the Sri Lanka Navy.

Economic ties
Sri Lanka and Russia have recently ramped up cooperation on expanding the tea trade between the two nations. Currently, approximately 17 percent of Sri Lanka's tea exports go to Russia. Sri Lankan teas account for 30% of Russia's tea market. In 2016, there were 58,176 Russian tourist arrived in Sri Lanka. This number is gradually increasing in recent years.

In December, 2017 Russia imposed a temporary restriction on the imports of agriculture products from Sri Lanka including Ceylon tea after an insect called the Khapra beetle was found in a consignment of tea. Later, however, it was revealed that the beetle is neither native to, nor lives in, Sri Lanka. Russia accounts for nearly 19 percent of Sri Lanka's $1.27 billion tea exports. After discussion with official delegation from the Sri Lanka Tea Board, Russia agreed to lift the restrictions from Dec 30. Sri Lanka also lifted a ban on asbestos, mainly imported from Russia. It was suspected Russia was not happy with the pro-Western policy of the UNP led Sri Lankan Government.

See also
 Foreign relations of Russia
 Foreign relations of Sri Lanka
 Embassy of Sri Lanka in Moscow

References

External links
  Sri Lanka Renews 51 Year Old Diplomatic Relationship with Russia
  Documents on the Russia – Sri Lanka relationship at the Russian Ministry of Foreign Affairs
 Sri Lanka president met his Russian counterpart Dimitry Medvedev and Chinese President Hu Jintao
 Sri Lanka – A Rajapaksa Factor
 Sri Lanka President warmly welcomed in Russia
 Rajapaksa visits Russia to bolster ties
 Russian envoy calls for stronger SL-Russia ties

Diplomatic missions
  Embassy of Russia in Colombo
  Embassy of Sri Lanka in Moscow

 
Sri Lanka
Bilateral relations of Sri Lanka